Japanese submarine I-54 may refer to one of the following submarines of the Imperial Japanese Navy:

 , a Kaidai-type submarine; renamed I-154 in May 1942; stricken from active duty in 1945; scuttled in 1946
 , an I-54-class submarine; sunk in 1944

Japanese Navy ship names
Imperial Japanese Navy ship names